The Puigcerdá was the only monitor ever commissioned in the history of the Spanish Armada, and was acquired to defend the estuary of Bilbao and the coast of Cantabria during the Third Carlist War, at a price of ₧840,000.

Construction and naming

The acquisition of Puigcerdá was approved on August 25, 1874, by General Serrano and Minister of Marine Rafael Rodriguez Arias.  The contract for the construction of the ship was signed September 11, 1874, with the ship to be built in the shipyard of the Forges et Chantiers de la Méditerranée, in La Seyne, Toulon, France.

By a Royal Order dated October 30, 1874 it was ordered that the ship be given the name:

Third Carlist War service

During the Third Carlist War, Puigcerdá defended the province of Vizcaya against Carlist troops. After the war the ship was laid up at Ferrol with the floating battery Duque de Tetuán, and was decommissioned in 1890.

Spanish–American War
With the breaking out of the Spanish–American War in 1898, Puigcerdá was recommissioned and rearmed, and dispatched for the defense of the Ria de Vigo.

Disposal

In 1900 Puigcerdá was decommissioned, and sold for 30,000 pesetas for civilian use as the small steamer Anita; later it was sold to John Holt & Co. of Liverpool.

References
 "The Monitor Puigcerda", Spanish–American War Centennial Website.

Gunboats of the Spanish Navy
Spanish–American War monitors of Spain
Ironclad warships of the Spanish Navy
Ships built in France
1874 ships